Mughar (also Romanized as Mūghār; also known as Moghār and Moqār) is a village in Garmsir Rural District, in the Central District of Ardestan County, Isfahan Province, Iran. At the 2006 census, its population was 1,272, in 340 families.

References 

Populated places in Ardestan County